is a Japanese individual rhythmic gymnast. She is the 2015 Asian Championships All-around bronze medalist.

Career
Hayakawa appeared in international junior competitions in 2010. Hayakawa has competed at the World Club Cup, the Aeon Cup in Tokyo, Japan. She has also competed in the Grand Prix and World Cup series.

Hayakawa appeared in Senior competitions in the 2013 Season, she competed in the Grand Prix and World Cup Rhythmic Gymnastics Series. On June 5–8, Hayakawa competed with Japanese Team at the 2013 Asian Championships. At the 2013 World Cup Final in St.Petersburg, she placed 16th in the all-around ahead of American Jasmine Kerber. Hayakawa then competed at the 2013 World Championships in Kyiv, Ukraine finishing 40th in the qualifications, she did not advance into the finals.

In 2014, Hayakawa competed in the 2014 Grand and 2014 World Cup series. She had her highest placement finishing 14th in all-around in the 2014 World Cup in Pesaro. Italy. On September 22–28, Hayakawa competed at the 2014 World Championships in Izmir, Turkey where she qualified for the all-around finals finishing in 16th position behind Elizaveta Nazarenkova of Uzbekistan. She then competed at the 2014 Asian Games and finished 6th in all-around behind of teammate Kaho Minagawa. On October 17–19, Hayakawa competed in Tokyo for the 2014 Aeon Cup, where she finished 7th in the All-around finals.

In 2015, Hayakawa began the season competing at the 2015 Moscow Grand Prix finishing 12th in the all-around and qualified to 3 event finals. On March 27–29, Hayakawa competed at the 2015 Lisboa World Cup finishing 20th in the all-around and qualified to 1 event final. She then competed at the 2015 Bucharest World Cup and finished 9th in the all-around behind Nazarenkova. On April 10–12, Hayakawa finished 21st in the all-around at the 2015 Pesaro World Cup. On May 22–24, Hayakawa competed at the 2015 Tashkent World Cup finishing 12th in the all-around. Hayakawa won the all-around bronze at the 2015 Asian Championships behind Uzbek gymnast Elizaveta Nazarenkova, in apparatus finals she won gold in hoop, silver in clubs, bronze in hoop and finished 6th in ball. Hayakawa then finished 7th in all-around at the 2015 Summer Universiade and qualified to 3 event finals. In August, Hayakawa finished 16th in the all-around at the 2015 Sofia World Cup behind American Laura Zeng. At the 2015 World Cup Final in Kazan, Hayakawa finished 23rd in the all-around. On September 9–13, Hayakawa (together with teammates Kaho Minagawa and Uzume Kawasaki) competed at the 2015 World Championships in Stuttgart were Team Japan finished 6th. Hayakwa qualified in the All-around finals finishing in 17th place with a total of 69.065 points. On October 2–4, Hayakawa together with teammates Kaho Minagawa and junior Ruriko Shibayama represented Aeon at the 2015 Aeon Cup in Tokyo Japan, Hayakawa finished 6th in the all-around finals with a total of 69.466 points and with Team Japan finishing 4th in the overall standings.

In 2016, Hayakawa started her season competing at the 2016 Espoo World Cup finishing 10th in the all-around and qualified to hoop, ball finals. On April 1–3, she competed at the 2016 Pesaro World Cup where she finished 15th in the all-around and finished 5th in clubs final. Hayakawa then finished 16th in the all-around at the 2016 Sofia World Cup. On June 3–5, Hayakawa finished 14th in the all-around at the 2016 Guadalajara World Cup with a total of 69.300 points.

Original Body Element
Sakura Hayakawa introduced a new rotation element for Rhythmic Gymnastics Code of Points in 2015 and the difficulty was accepted by FIG. She was the first gymnast to perform a flat foot in rotation with the free leg in ring position and trunk horizontally. Each turn is worth 0.40 points.

Routine music information

References

External links
 
 Rhythmic Gymnastics Results 
 

1997 births
Living people
People from Osaka
Sportspeople from Osaka
Japanese rhythmic gymnasts
Gymnasts at the 2014 Asian Games
Asian Games competitors for Japan
20th-century Japanese women
21st-century Japanese women